Alders (Alnus species) are used as food plants by the larvae of a number of Lepidoptera species:

Monophagous
Species which feed exclusively on Alnus:
 Bucculatricidae
 Bucculatrix locuples – only on tag alder (A. serrulata)
 Coleophoridae
 Coleophora alnifoliae
 Geometridae
 Hydriomena impluviata (May highflyer)
 Pyralidae
 Glyptoteles leucacrinella

Polyphagous
Species which feed on Alnus among other plants:
 Arctiidae
 Arctia caja (great tiger moth)
 Halysidota tessellaris (banded tussock moth)
 Lophocampa maculata (spotted tussock moth)
 Spilosoma luteum (buff ermine)
 Bucculatricidae
 Bucculatrix cidarella – recorded on black alder (A. glutinosa), grey alder (A. (incana) incana) and green alder (A. viridis)
 Coleophoridae
 Several Coleophora species:
 C. alniella
 C. anatipennella
 C. binderella – recorded on black alder (A. glutinosa)
 C. comptoniella
 C. fuscedinella
 C. malivorella
 C. orbitella
 C. persimplexella – recorded on green alder (A. viridis)
 C. pruniella
 C. serratella
 Drepanidae
 Drepana arcuata (arched hooktip)
 Drepana binaria (oak hook-tip)
 Geometridae
Agriopis marginaria (dotted border)
 Alcis repandata (mottled beauty)
 Antepione thisoaria (variable antepione)
 Besma quercivoraria (oak besma)
 Biston betularia (peppered moth)
 Cabera exanthemata (common wave)
 Cabera pusaria (common white wave)
 Campaea perlata (pale beauty)
 Chloroclysta truncata (common marbled carpet)
 Cingilia catenaria (chain-dotted geometer)
 Crocallis elinguaria (scalloped oak)
 Cyclophora pendulinaria (sweetfern geometer)
 Ectropis crepuscularia (engrailed)
 Ennomos magnaria (maple spanworm)
 Epirrita autumnata (autumnal moth)
 Eupithecia subfuscata (grey pug)
 Geometra papilionaria (large emerald)
 Hypagyrtis unipunctata (one-spotted variant)
 Iridopsis larvaria (bent-lined gray)
 Melanolophia canadaria (Canadian melanolophia)
 Nematocampa resistaria (filament bearer)
 Odontopera bidentata (scalloped hazel) – recorded on grey alder (A. (incana) incana)
 Operophtera bruceata (Bruce spanworm)
 Pero hubneraria (Hübner's pero)
 Selenia tetralunaria (purple thorn)
 Tetracis cachexiata (white slant-line)
 Hepialidae
 Endoclita auratus
 Endoclita undulifer
 Sthenopis argenteomaculatus
 Lasiocampidae
 Malacosoma disstria (forest tent caterpillar moth)
 Phyllodesma americana (lappet moth)
 Lymantriidae
Euproctis similis (yellow-tail)
 Lymantria dispar (gypsy moth) – recorded on speckled alder (A. (incana) rugosa)
 Orgyia antiqua (rusty tussock moth)
 Megalopygidae
 Megalopyge crispata (black-waved flannel moth)
 Noctuidae
Acronicta americana (American dagger moth)
 Acronicta dactylina (fingered dagger moth)
 Acronicta funeralis (funerary dagger moth)
 Acronicta grisea (gray dagger)
 Acronicta leporina (miller)
 Acronicta megacephala (poplar grey) – recorded on grey alder (A. (incana) incana)
 Acronicta psi (grey dagger)
 Lithophane innominata (nameless pinion)
 Melanchra assimilis
 Melanchra persicariae (dot moth) – recorded on grey alder (A. (incana) incana)
 Orthosia gothica (Hebrew character) – recorded on grey alder (A. (incana) incana)
 Palthis angulalis (dark-spotted palthis)
 Notodontidae
Nadata gibbosa (rough prominent)
 Oligocentria semirufescens (red-washed prominent)
 Ptilodon capucina (coxcomb prominent)
 Nymphalidae
 Limenitis arthemis (American white admiral/red-spotted purple) – recorded on speckled alder (A. (incana) rugosa)
 Saturniidae
 Hyalophora columbia (Columbia silkmoth) – recorded on speckled alder (A. (incana) rugosa)
 Pavonia pavonia (emperor moth)
 Sphingidae
 Amorpha juglandis (walnut sphinx)
 Laothoe populi (poplar hawk-moth)
 Mimas tiliae (lime hawk-moth)

References

External links

Alnus
Lepidoptera